St. Nicholas Church is one of the oldest and most prominent landmarks in Ghent, Belgium. Begun in the early 13th century as a replacement for an earlier Romanesque church, construction continued through the rest of the century in the local Scheldt Gothic style (named after the nearby river). Typical of this style is the use of blue-gray stone from the Tournai area, the single large tower above the crossing, and the slender turrets at the building's corners.

Built in the old trade center of Ghent next to the bustling Korenmarkt (Wheat Market), St. Nicholas Church was popular with the guilds whose members carried out their business nearby. The guilds had their own chapels which were added to the sides of the church in the 14th and 15th centuries.

The central tower, which was funded in part by the city, served as an observation post and carried the town bells until the neighboring belfry of Ghent was built. These two towers, along with the Saint Bavo Cathedral, still define the famous medieval skyline of the city center. One of the treasures of the church is its organ, produced by the famous French organ builder Aristide Cavaillé-Coll.

Restoration
The building gradually deteriorated through the centuries, to a degree that threatened its stability. Cracks were overlaid with plaster, windows were bricked up to reinforce the walls, and in the 18th century, little houses and shops were built up against the dilapidated facades. Interest in the church as a historical monument arose around 1840, and at the turn of the 20th century major restoration plans emerged. The houses alongside the church were demolished and much renovation work has been carried out since then.

Organ

The organ in the Saint Nicholas Church  is one of the most important romantic organs of  Belgium.
It was built by the noted French organ builder Aristide Cavaillé-Coll.

History 
Before the Cavaillé-Coll organ, the church had an organ built in 1840 by the Flemish organ builder Pierre Van Pethegem.

In 1850, François-Joseph Fétis advocated the construction of a model organ in Belgium, he got support from dean Désiré Ignace Verduyn.
They asked Cavaillé-Coll to make a proposal for a new organ, the first CC organ in Belgium.

In a first proposal of March, 1853, Aristide Cavaillé-Coll suggested a two-manual instrument, partially reusing material of the Van Peteghem organ.
A second proposal also suggested a two-manual instrument with almost identical disposition.

The third proposal of September 3, 1853 describes the final three-manual organ in a new case with 16' pipes in the front (Grand Orgue dit de seize pieds en Monfre).

Construction of the organ began in 1853, it was completed in 1856.
The inauguration concert was performed by Louis James Alfred Lefébure-Wély on March 11, 1856.

Organists
 1856–1867: Auguste Strauven
 1867–1901: Désiré Van Reysschoot.
 1901–1946: Cyriel Van den Abeele

Restoration
During the restoration of the church, the organ was enclosed in a wooden case. The organ was last played in 1961. For half a century the organ could not be played nor seen.

In 2010 the wooden case was removed, the organ was cleaned and became visible again. It is not playable yet since the wind supply was removed and is currently in storage.

In 2013 the organ loft and the organ were hydraulically leveled as a first step in the restoration process.

Disposition 
Original disposition of March 11, 1856 (retaining the original French names):

 Couplers: 
 Orage
 Cop. Pédale 
 Appel d'anches pédale
 Octaves graves Pos., G.O., Réc. 
 Appel d'anches Pos., G.O., Réc. 
 Accoupl. Pos./G.O., Réc./G.O. 
 Trémolo voix humaine

Gallery

See also
 List of tallest structures built before the 20th century

Notes

External links
 Official site
 Interior of the Saint Nicholas church in 360°
 Official site of the church
 Gent, St Niklaaskerk, Hoofdorgel
 Organ photographs site

Ghent
Ghent, Nicholas
Ghent, Nicholas
Nicholas